Seh Gonbad is a village in Darbqazi Rural District, in the Central District of Nishapur County, Razavi Khorasan Province, Iran. As of the 2006 census it had a population of 144 divided between 32 families.

References 

Populated places in Nishapur County